Payippad  is a village in Alappuzha district in the state of Kerala, India. The village is situated about 10 km east of Harippad (the nearest town) on the Harippad, Veeyapuram road. Payippad is better known for the Payippad boat race.

References

Villages in Alappuzha district